Single Cuts is a limited edition box set by English heavy metal band Judas Priest consisting of 20 of the band's singles on 20 CDs including all original B-sides, making a total of 51 tracks. It was announced on 7 June 2011, for release on 25 August, later delayed to 17 October for "technical reasons", with free magnets being offered as a compensation for the delay to anyone who pre-ordered the box set.

Track listing
The compilation contains all 20 of the songs Judas Priest released as singles on Columbia Records and CBS Records between 1977 and 1992 in the United Kingdom, including all original B-sides.

References

Judas Priest compilation albums
2011 compilation albums